Pinchas Freudiger, also Fülöp Freudiger, Philip von Freudiger (born 1900 in Budapest, Austria-Hungary, died 1976 in Israel) was a Hungarian-Israeli manufacturer and Jewish community leader.

Life
Philip von Freudiger was a grandson of the textile manufacturer Mózes Freudiger (1833-1911), who was one of the founders of the Jewish Orthodox community in Budapest and was elevated to nobility. Pinchas Freudiger studied and entered the family business.

He was a member of the Jewish Orthodox council in Budapest and took over in 1939 his chairmanship in succession to his late father Abraham Freudiger (1868-1939),

Holocaust

Since 1938 the authoritarian Horthy regime of Hungary tightened anti-Semitic laws  enacted to make the Jews socially isolated.

After the German invasion of Poland in 1939 a few Jews managed to flee to Hungary. Freudiger and others created support organizations for the supply and onward journey of these people. Meanwhile the Jews of Hungarian nationality  believed in their safety in spite of anti-Semitism in the country.

In the war against the Soviet Union in 1941 the Jewish men were not recruited for the Hungarian army, but used in forced labor battalions often stationed behind or at the front.

In 1942, after intense pressure by Rabbi Chaim Michael Dov Weissmandl of the Bratislava Working Group, the Hungarian Orthodox Community he led helped financially the persecuted Jews in Slovakia to pay a ransom to the Nazis to stop the Slovak transports to Auschwitz and the transports stopped for two years.

After the German occupation of Hungary on March 19, 1944, Freudiger and Samu Stern were appointed by the Germans as representatives of the Orthodox and Neologue community for the Jewish Council (Judenrat, Zsidó tanács) in Budapest.  The Jewish Council was among recipients of the Vrba–Wetzler report, also known as the Auschwitz Protocols, the Auschwitz Report. It detailed the atrocities in Auschwitz. Much like Rezső Kasztner (aka Rudolf), members of the Jewish Council failed to publicize the atrocities and warn the Jews of Hungary of their fate.

In Israel
Freudiger and his family escaped to Palestine via Romania in August 1944 in coordination with very high ranking SS officers Dieter Wisliceny and Hermann Krumey. They warned Freudiger that Eichmann hated him, partly because of his red beard, and intended to imminently put him on a transport.

He testified at the Eichmann trial in Jerusalem.

References

Further reading
 Randolph L. Braham: The Politics of Genocide: The Holocaust in Hungary. New York: Columbia University Press, 1981
 Mária Schmidt: Kollaboráció vagy kooperáció? A Budapesti Zsidó Tanács. Budapest:: Minerva, 1990 
 Randolph L. Braham: Freudiger, Fülöp, in: Encyclopedia of the Holocaust, 1990, Vol. 2, p. 532
 Freudiger, Fülöp, in: Encyclopedia of the Holocaust, 1993, Volume 1, p. 497
 Freudiger, Fülöp, in: Walter Laqueur (ed.): The Holocaust encyclopedia. New Haven: Yale Univ. Press, 2001, p. 225

1900 births
1976 deaths
Businesspeople from Budapest
People who rescued Jews during the Holocaust
Hungarian emigrants to Israel
Austro-Hungarian Jews
Jews who emigrated to escape Nazism
Jewish activists
Hungarian Orthodox Jews